Lee In-woo (born 19 May 1972) is a South Korean professional golfer.

Lee plays mainly on the OneAsia Tour and the Korean Tour. He won the 2012 Volvik Hildesheim Open, co-sanctioned by the Asian Tour and the Korean Tour.

Professional wins (2)

Asian Tour wins (1)

1Co-sanctioned by the Korean Tour

Korean Tour wins (2)

1Co-sanctioned by the Asian Tour

References

External links

South Korean male golfers
Golfers from Seoul
1972 births
Living people